Swalwell is a surname. Notable people with the surname include:

Eric Swalwell (born 1980), American politician
Ken Swalwell (born c. 1930), Canadian football player and discus thrower
Reginald Swalwell (1873–1930), British cricketer

English toponymic surnames